The Piscataway Conoy Tribe of Maryland is a North American Indian tribe recognized by the state of Maryland. They are a part of the Piscataway Conoy Tribal Nation.

History
Prior to European contact, the Piscataway Conoy Tribe was a part of a confederacy of tribes occupying the areas between the Chesapeake Bay and the Potomac River watershed. The tribe's traditional territory included present-day Charles, Prince George's, St. Mary's, and Baltimore counties, as well as the foothills of the Appalachians. The Piscataway-Conoy were some of the first Native Americans to make contact with European settlers. Colonial expansion led to a 1666 treaty between tribal leadership and Lord Baltimore, resulting in the establishment of a reservation called Piscataway Manor. During this time many Piscataway people converted to Catholicism. To escape persecution by settler society, some of the Piscataway migrated to settlements along the Susquehanna River into Virginia and Pennsylvania, where the Iroquois gave them the name 'Conoy'. In 1974 Turkey Tayac, Piscataway Indian leader, incorporated a non-profit organization called the "Piscataway-Conoy Indians."

Revitalization: 20th-21st century 
In 1995, the Piscataway Conoy Tribe began petitioning for formal state recognition of their tribe. The Piscataway Conoy tribe, along with the Piscataway Indian Nation, were recognized by the Governor of Maryland Martin O'Malley on January 9, 2012. The Executive Order granted Maryland Indian status but did not affect rights to land or gaming rights. As part of the negotiation for state recognition, the Piscataway Conoy tribe renounced any plans to open casinos. In 2021, St. Mary's College of Maryland launched an initiative to acknowledge the land on which the College sits as the ancestral home of the Yacocomico and Piscataway Peoples. In November 2021, the University of Maryland announced the name of its new dining hall would be Yahentamitsi in honor of the state’s Piscataway Conoy Tribe.

References

External links 
 Conoy - Encyclopædia Britannica 

Native Americans in Maryland

Piscataway tribe